Daria is an American adult animated sitcom.

Daria or Darya may also refer to:

People
 Daria (name), people named Daria or Darya
 St. Daria (died ), early Christian martyr

Other uses 
 Daria (hurricane), or the Burns' Day Storm
 Daria (moth), a genus of moth
 Amu Darya, river in Central Asia and Afghanistan
 "Daría", a song by La 5ª Estación from their 2004 album Flores de Alquiler

See also
 Dario (disambiguation)
 Darius (disambiguation)
 Dari (disambiguation)